Baljinder Kaur is an Indian actress who has appeared in Haryanvi, Hindi and Tamil films.

Career
Kaur was born and brought up in the village of Bhondian near Bhogpur, Punjab. She developed an interest in theatre during her education at DAV College, Hoshiarpur and in 1994, chose to study a degree in drama over education at Punjab University. After graduating, she started teaching drama at a school in Hisar, Haryana and later married Brijesh Sharma in 2000, who was her classmate at university and during another stint at the National School of Drama. During her time at drama school, she learnt various forms of classical dance and music and later worked for six years as a member of the repertory.

Kaur made her acting debut as a film actress through the critically acclaimed Hindi film, Shahid (2013), after being approached by the casting director, Mukesh Chabra, who had see one of Kaur's stage performances. She won critical acclaim for her role in the project and was subsequently approached to play roles in two of Aamir Khan's films, PK (2014) and Dangal (2016), but turned down the opportunities indicating her reluctance to work on glamorous roles. In 2014, she worked on the Haryanvi film Pagdi: The Honour directed by Rajiv Bhatia, who she knew from her time at the School of Drama. Her husband, Brijesh Sharma, also portrayed a role in the film as the heroine's father. For her performance in the film, she received the National Film Award for Best Supporting Actress and was also subsequently recognised by Punjab University for her work. She was then subsequently seen as a Mardwari woman from the slums of Chennai in Sudha Kongara Prasad's bilingual film, Saala Khadoos. For her part in the Tamil version, she memorised her dialogues after translating the script phonetically into English.

Filmography

References

External links

Indian film actresses
Actresses in Tamil cinema
Actresses in Hindi cinema
Best Supporting Actress National Film Award winners
Living people
Year of birth missing (living people)
Actresses from Punjab, India
People from Jalandhar district
21st-century Indian actresses